{{Automatic Taxobox
| image = Nilssonia formosa live.jpg
| taxon = Nilssonia
| authority = Gray, 1872
| subdivision_ranks = Species
| subdivision = 1-5, see text
| synonyms =
 Nilssonia Gray, 1872: 332
 Isola Gray, 1873: 51
 Aspideretes O.P. Hay, 1904: 274
| synonyms_ref      = <ref name="ttwg">Turtle Taxonomy Working Group [van Dijk PP, Iverson JB, Rhodin AGJ, Shaffer HB, Bour R] (2014). "Turtles of the world, 7th edition: annotated checklist of taxonomy, synonymy, distribution with maps, and conservation status". In: Rhodin AGJ, Pritchard PCH, van Dijk PP, Saumure RA, Buhlmann KA, Iverson JB, Mittermeier RA (editors) (2014). "Conservation Biology of Freshwater Turtles and Tortoises: A Compilation Project of the IUCN/SSC Tortoise and Freshwater Turtle Specialist Group". Chelonian Research Monographs 5 (7): 000.329–479, doi:10.3854/ crm.5.000.checklist.v7.2014.</ref>
}}Nilssonia is a genus of softshell turtles (family Trionychidae) from rivers, streams, ponds, and lakes in South Asia and Burma. In many treatments, it is monotypic, with the single species Burmese peacock softshell (N. formosa). However, the supposed other genus of peacock softshells, Aspideretes, is more closely related to N. formosa than had been believed. They differ only in the neural plates between the first pleural scale pair of the bony carapace, which are fused into one in N. formosa and unfused in the others.

Thus, it has been proposed to unite the two genera under the older name, Nilssonia. As it seems, the closest living relatives of the Burmese peacock softshell are the Indian softshell turtle (A./N. gangeticus) and the Leith's softshell turtle (A./N. leithii), making the merging of the genera well warranted.

Etymology
The generic name, Nilssonia, is in honor of Swedish zoologist Sven Nilsson.

Species
If the genera are united, the five species are:

Nilssonia formosa  – Burmese peacock softshell, Burmese softshell turtle 
Nilssonia gangetica  – Indian softshell turtle, Ganges softshell turtle 
Nilssonia hurum  – Indian peacock softshell turtle
Nilssonia leithii  – Leith's softshell turtle, Nagpur softshell turtle 
Nilssonia nigricans  – black softshell turtle, Bostami turtle

References

 
Turtle genera
Taxa named by John Edward Gray
Taxonomy articles created by Polbot